Kuri (also Romanized as Kūrī; also known as Korī) is a village in Jam Rural District, in the Central District of Jam County, Bushehr Province, Iran. At the 2006 census, its population was 404, in 82 families.

References 

Populated places in Jam County